Beautiful Jersey or Man Bieau P'tit Jèrri is a Jersey patriotic song, sung in Jèrriais and English. It was composed by an Englishman, Lindsay Lennox, who died in 1906. During the Occupation, islanders would sing the song to keep their spirits up. Today it is performed at Liberation Day and as Jersey's national anthem at some sporting events.

Use 
Every year, Beautiful Jersey is sung at the main Liberation Day service in Liberation Square. Sadie Le Sueur-Renard, the late Connétable of St Saviour used to sing the song.

National anthem 
It is considered by many as a suitable national anthem for Jersey, and functioned as an unofficial anthem for Jersey prior to Island Home being declared the official Jersey anthem. Even still, it has been performed as the national anthem for Jersey in the 2015 Island Games for the opening and medal ceremonies.

In a 2015 poll by the Jersey Evening Post, over a third of islanders questioned wanted Beautiful Jersey to be recognised as the national anthem for Jersey, compared to under 20% for Island Home, the official anthem.

Lyrics

English 
The lyrics in English are usually sung second –

See also 

 God Save the Queen
 Island Home (anthem)
 Ma Normandie

References 

Jersey culture
Norman music
British anthems
Regional songs